Kim Su-yeon (born April 24, 2001) is a South Korean pair skater. With her brother, Kim Hyung-tae, she is the 2017 Asian Open Figure Skating Trophy champion, the 2017 Toruń Cup silver medalist and the 2017 South Korean national silver medalist. They competed at the 2017 Four Continents Championships.

Career 
Kim Su-yeon began learning to skate in 2010. She and her brother, Kim Hyung-tae, started competing as a pair in the 2015–2016 season. Their international debut came in February 2016 at the Winter Youth Olympics in Hamar, Norway. The pair finished 8th at the event.

The Kim siblings debuted on the Junior Grand Prix series in September 2016, placing 13th in Ostrava, Czech Republic, and 8th in Saransk, Russia. Making their senior debut, they finished 7th at the 2016 CS Ondrej Nepela Memorial a couple of weeks later. In early January 2017, the pair obtained the silver medal at the South Korean Championships, having placed third in the short program and first in the free skate. Later in the same month, they received their first senior international medal, winning silver at the Toruń Cup in Toruń, Poland. In February, the siblings competed at their first ISU Championship — the 2017 Four Continents Championships in Gangneung, South Korea. They finished 12th at the event.

Programs 
(with Kim Hyung-tae)

Competitive highlights 
CS: Challenger Series; JGP: Junior Grand Prix

With Kim Hyung-tae

Detailed results

References

External links 
 

2001 births
South Korean female pair skaters
Living people
People from Gwacheon
Figure skaters at the 2016 Winter Youth Olympics
Figure skaters at the 2017 Asian Winter Games
Sportspeople from Gyeonggi Province